The New Perry Mason is a CBS TV series that ran from 1973 to 1974. It was a revival of the 1957 Perry Mason television series about Erle Stanley Gardner's brilliant defense attorney.

Plot
All of the major characters of the original series appeared in the revival, along with Gertie, a receptionist seldom seen in the original (and played by Connie Cezon on the few occasions when she was), and the plots and their devices were along the lines of the original.  The familiar theme song of the original, "Park Avenue Beat," was replaced by a generic dramatic fanfare.

Cast
 Monte Markham as Perry Mason
 Sharon Acker as Della Street
 Albert Stratton as Paul Drake
 Dane Clark as Lt. Arthur Tragg
 Harry Guardino as Hamilton Burger
 Brett Somers as Gertie Lade

Production

Development
While several production personnel had worked on the original Perry Mason series (including executive producer Cornwell Jackson, producers Ernie Frankel and Art Seid, and director Arthur Marks), the series was made without the participation of any members of the original cast, with Monte Markham taking over the role that Raymond Burr played in the original series. Produced by 20th Century Fox Television, it aired Sundays at 7:30 pm (EST) on CBS, the same network which had aired the original series, during the 1973–74 season. A total of 15 episodes were produced and aired.

Cancellation
This revival was cancelled at midseason, after failing to overtake NBC's The Wonderful World of Disney and ABC's The F.B.I. in the ratings in its Sunday night time slot. It ranked 71st out of 80 shows airing that season, with a 13.1 household rating. It was soon replaced by Apple's Way.

Episodes

References

 Brooks, Tim and Marsh, Earle, The Complete Directory to Prime Time Network and Cable TV Shows 1946–Present

External links
 

1973 American television series debuts
1974 American television series endings
1970s American crime television series
1970s American drama television series
1970s American legal television series
CBS original programming
English-language television shows
Super Bowl lead-out shows
Television shows based on American novels
Television series reboots
Television series by 20th Century Fox Television
Perry Mason
Television shows set in Los Angeles